Daniel Prenn (7 September 1904 – 3 September 1991) was a Russian Empire-born German, Polish, and British tennis player who was Jewish. He was ranked the world No. 6 for 1932 by A. Wallis Myers, and the European No. 1 by "American Lawn Tennis" magazine. He was ranked world No. 8 in 1929 (Bill Tilden), world No. 7 in 1934 (American Lawn Tennis), and was ranked No. 1 in Germany for the four years from 1928 to 1932. He was a runner-up for the mixed doubles title of Wimbledon in 1930. When the Nazis came to power in Germany in 1933, they barred him from playing because he was Jewish. He emigrated from Germany to England, and later became a successful businessman.

Early life
Prenn was born on 7 September 1904 in Vilna, Russian Empire to a railway building contractor, and was Jewish. He grew up primarily in St. Petersburg, in Russia. To escape the local antisemitism, the family moved to Berlin after World War I, in 1920.

Apart from tennis, Prenn was an amateur boxer and runner. He graduated from the Technische Hochschule of Charlottenberg, Germany, earning a doctorate in engineering in 1929.

Table tennis career
Prenn represented Germany in the 1926 World Table Tennis Championships in London, reaching the fourth round in singles and the quarterfinals in doubles.

Tennis career
In 1928 he won the German Open Tennis Championships.

In 1930 he was a German Club team champion representing the Rot-Weiss Tennis Club of Berlin, beating fellow hometown club Blau-Weiss eight to one. Prenn won both of his doubles matches. He failed to win the Berlin international Championships, and subsequently lost to Bill Tilden in the final. He also lost the doubles with his Davis Cup teammate Heinrich Kleinschroth to the duo of Tilden and Erik Worm. A month later they met again in a match for the Dutch Championships doubles title, although this time they formed a team and won against the Dutch champions Hendrik Timmer and Arthur Diemer Kool.

In 1931 he won the singles, doubles, and mixed doubles championships of the City of Dresden tournament. The same year he lost the Berlin International Championships the second time to Roderich Menzel in straight sets, but won the doubles partnering with him.

He was a runner-up for the Danish Covered Court Championships in 1932, losing to Danish champion Einer Ulrich. He received the Reichsmedaille for winning the European Zone of the 1932 International Lawn Tennis Challenge.

In the Davis Cup from 1928 through 1932, Prenn played 13 matches, winning 17 rubbers and losing 5, compiling a 73% winning record.

He rose to the top of the German rankings starting from 1925 when he was ranked 15, in 1926 broke into the top ten at 10th, in 1927 he was the fourth-best player in the country and from 1928 to 1932 he peaked the German tennis charts.

After he was barred from tennis because he was Jewish, first he tried to apply for a Polish playing license to be part of the Poland Davis Cup team but was rejected by the Polski Związek Tenisowy (Polish Tennis Association) mostly as a result of his dismissal of previous Polish invitations and because he dropped his Polish citizenship earlier in 1932. He then changed nationality and represented Great Britain in the 1935 Maccabiah Games in Palestine.

After moving to Great Britain he had a successive run in winning a series of tournaments in 1933, including the Scottish Lowland Championships against Antoine Gentien, the West of England Championships against Hendrik Timmer (also finalist in doubles) and the Paris Championships against Christian Boussus.

In 1934, he clinched the Surrey covered courts tournament in Dulwich after defeating American David Jones.

In 1935, he was the runner-up for the mixed doubles contest of the British Hard Court Championships pairing up with Evelyn Dearman. Unfortunately a flu prevented his partner from competing that day and they had to skip the match and so the victory was awarded to their opponents. He lost the Harrow tournament of London to Bunny Austin in straight sets, and the French Covered Court Championships to Jean Borotra, also in straights. The same year he won the Surrey Hard Court Championships at Roehampton against South African player Pat Spence. 

In 1937, he lost the Priory tournament final to Kho Sin-Kie.

Controversies
In early 1931, he was accused of turning professional (meaning he broke the rule of amateurism) and had to skip a couple of months before being acquitted, when it turned out that he had been mistaken for another person named Danel Prenn Several months later the German Tennis Union suspended him for another six months for sponsorship charges, based on the accusations of racquet manufacturer Hammer & Co. who claimed Prenn asked for payment for choosing Hammer's equipment. Local media labelled this action as anti-semitic, and it being forged by Hammer Company. As a result of his suspension Prenn's titles were taken back, as well as his amateur license. He was also expelled from the Germany Davis Cup team, though it didn't affect his presence as Germany was eliminated in the first round of the 1931 International Lawn Tennis Challenge

On 24 April 1933, a newly appointed Reichssportführer issued a declaration on behalf of the German Tennis Lawn Association stating that no Jew could be selected for the national team or the Davis Cup, and that no Jewish or Marxist club or association could be affiliated with the German Tennis Federation, and specifically that the Jewish player named Dr. Prenn would not be selected to the German Davis Cup team in 1933. The Swedish king, Gustaf V, a keen tennis player, dined with the German top brass in the summer of 1933, criticizing the new racial policies. After the lunch, the elderly king played a game with Prenn. Shortly thereafter, Prenn moved to Great Britain.

German Baron Gottfried von Cramm protested against the treatment of Prenn, and as a result, von Cramm was targeted and arrested on charges of homosexuality and imprisoned.

Personal life after Germany
After moving to England he launched his own audio equipment company around 1932 in Kentish Town. From 1946 to 1949, he had five patents related to plastic molding. His company, Truvox Engineering, was sold to Racal in 1969 for $1.26 million. In 1970, he founded Celestion Electronics, a loudspeaker manufacturer.

He had several children, Oliver (b. 1939) later become a Wimbledon Junior Champion, and competed in the main Wimbledon competitions as well. Oliver also took over the family enterprise in 1988 and runs the firm to this day. Another son John Allen Nicholas was a shareholder in Lacoste, and as an avid supporter of tennis and squash he got Celestion involved in a racquet sponsoring venture, which ended in 2010. He still has an interest in or owns a dozen companies.

Daniel Prenn was inducted into the International Jewish Sports Hall of Fame in 1981.

Grand Slam finals

Mixed doubles: (1 runner-up)

See also
List of select Jewish tennis players

References

External links

 
 
 

1904 births
1991 deaths
British male tennis players
German emigrants to the United Kingdom
German male tennis players
Jewish tennis players
Naturalised citizens of the United Kingdom
Sportspeople from Vilnius
Polish emigrants to the United Kingdom
Polish male tennis players
German male table tennis players
Jewish table tennis players
20th-century British businesspeople
Competitors at the 1935 Maccabiah Games
Maccabiah Games tennis players
Maccabiah Games competitors for Great Britain
20th-century Russian Jews